The 1948 Florida Gators football team represented the University of Florida during the 1948 college football season. The season was the third for Raymond Wolf as the Florida Gators football team's head coach. The season's highlights included the Gators' 16–9 win against the Auburn Tigers and their 27–13 homecoming victory over the Miami Hurricanes. Wolf's 1948 Florida Gators finished with a 5–5 overall record and a 1–5 record in the Southeastern Conference (SEC), placing tenth among twelve SEC teams.

Schedule

Postseason
Several members of the Florida Board of Control and a number of Florida alumni called for Wolf to step down after the 1948 season, but football player-led student rallies in his support ended with Wolf's contract being extended for another year.

References

Florida
Florida Gators football seasons
Florida Gators football